NBC 18 may refer to one of the following television stations in the United States:

WETM-TV, Elmira, New York
WHIZ-TV, Zanesville, Ohio
WLEX-TV, Lexington, Kentucky